Revolutionary committee may refer to:

Revolutionary committee (China), committees that took over the functions of government during the Cultural Revolution
Revolutionary Committee (Persia), played a role in the Persian Constitutional Revolution of 1905–1911
Revolutionary committee (Soviet), Bolshevik provisional governments in envisioned Soviet republics
Galician Revolutionary Committee
Siberian Revolutionary Committee
Provisional Polish Revolutionary Committee
Military Revolutionary Committee
Supreme Revolutionary Committee, the unrecognized acting government of Yemen
Revolutionary Committee of the Batavian Republic
Revolutionary Committee of the Chinese Kuomintang
Revolutionary Committee of Puerto Rico
Bulgarian Revolutionary Central Committee
Bulgarian Secret Central Revolutionary Committee
Islamic Revolution Committees, Iran
Punjab Communist Revolutionary Committee
Revolutionary Committee of Unity and Action
Revolutionary Committee (Gabon), a faction in the 1964 Gabonese coup d'état

See also 

 Revolutionary Council (disambiguation)
 Revolutionary Command Council (disambiguation)
 Workers' council